Sign Post is an unincorporated community in Accomack County, Virginia.

References

Unincorporated communities in Virginia
Unincorporated communities in Accomack County, Virginia